Tommy Gunn was an action figure or boys' doll produced by Pedigree Toys Ltd from 1966 until 1968. The basic doll depicted a British infantry soldier of the time complete with Sterling submachine gun but was also available in World War II dress carrying a Sten gun.

It is rumoured that the designers at Pedigree had contacts within the British Ministry of Defence and hence were able to get accurate drawings of British military weapons and dress leading to better models than Palitoy could offer - for instance, the boots had actual laces in them. The standard of construction of the dolls was also considered better by some, and it did indeed offer a better level of articulation than primary competitor Action Man; having better and more authentic shaped hands and grip gave more equipment holding options and was, more importantly, able to stand, run stooped, and adopt a 'kneel + firing' position without alternative support, much easier than the Action Man figure. 

Whilst Action Man originally offered the ability to acquire a free figure (although these models were production 'seconds' often arriving with two of same hand, or overly stiff or impaired articulation etc.) by collection of on-pack 'stars' (which were relative in value to the cost of the item), Tommy Gunn included a 'cigarette style' Medal card in each pack. These were saved onto a presentation card and sent off when the set was completed. The card and 'perfect/boxed' new figure were returned together. However, the presentation cards were red biro (indelible ball point) inked crossed, which seemed a shame as the cards were very detailed and thus, spoilt the presentation.

Despite all this, they were unable to offer the same wide range as Palitoy who had access to all Hasbro's designs and Tommy Gunn sold in much lower volumes and production was halted in 1968. After Tommy Gunn's demise, Palitoy shifted the theme of Action Man towards British armed forces rather than following Hasbro's American outfits. Whether this was related is debatable.  Pedigree Toys went on to use the body moulds for Tommy Gunn to make action figures of the characters from the TV series Captain Scarlet and the Mysterons and these sold well for a brief period. 

Tommy Gunn and the Captain Scarlet figures are now very rare and are highly collectable.

Action figures
Playscale figures
Lines Bros